Greg Gantt (October 30, 1951 – October 26, 2011) was an American football punter. He played for the New York Jets from 1974 to 1975.

He died of complications of heart disease and diabetes on October 26, 2011, in Birmingham, Alabama at age 59.

References

1951 births
2011 deaths
American football punters
Alabama Crimson Tide football players
New York Jets players